Barumbu is a municipality (commune) in the Lukunga district of Kinshasa, the capital city of the Democratic Republic of the Congo.

It is situated in the north of Kinshasa, south of Gombe and the Boulevard du 30 Juin. Barumbu is historically significant because it developed along with the old town of Kinshasa, into the modern city Kinshasa, and formerly Léopoldville.

Government
The Régie des Voies Aériennes de la République Démocratique du Congo has its head office in the Ndolo neighbourhood of Barumbu.

Economy
The airline Air Kasaï had its head office on the property of N'Dolo Airport in Barumbu.

When it operated, Hewa Bora Airways had its head office in Barumbu.

Demographics

References

See also

Communes of Kinshasa
Lukunga District